The Pandora Mission, Pandora SmallSat, or Pandora, is a small satellite mission known as SmallSat, one of three orbital missions approved by NASA to pass to the next development phase in NASA's Astrophysics Pioneers program. The budget for each mission was $20 million. 

The mission is intended to determine atmospheric compositions by observing exoplanets and their host stars at the same time in both visible and infrared light over long periods of time. 

The satellite will have sensitivity to identify exoplanets with hydrogen or water in present in their atmospheres, as well was what exoplanets are covered by clouds or hazes. Pandora will observe 20 stars and their 39 exoplanets with sizes that range from Earth-size to Jupiter-size, and host stars ranging from mid-K to late-M spectral types.

References

Satellites
Spaceflight